Luciano Antonio Montivero (born 21 September 1978) is an Argentine road cyclist, who currently rides for UCI Continental team .

Major results

2002
 1st Overall Giro del Sol San Juan
2004
 1st Overall Giro del Sol San Juan
 5th Time trial, National Road Championships
 10th Overall Vuelta del Uruguay
2005
 1st Overall Vuelta a San Juan
1st Stage 8
 5th Road race, National Road Championships
2007
 1st Overall Vuelta a San Juan
 3rd Overall 
 5th Road race, National Road Championships
2009
 3rd Overall Vuelta a San Juan
1st Stage 6
2010
 1st Stage 9 
 2nd Overall Vuelta a San Juan
 3rd Overall 
2011
 1st Overall 
1st Prologue (TTT) & Stage 9
 2nd Road race, National Road Championships
2014
 1st Overall 
2017
 1st Prologue (TTT) Giro del Sol San Juan

References

External links

1978 births
Living people
Argentine male cyclists